The University of Cambridge was the first institution in the world to award a dedicated Bachelor of Music degree. The Faculty of Music was established in 1947, and has this since grown into an academic centre covering all the aspects of study and research within in music.

The most recent Research Assessment Exercise (2008) judged research at the Faculty to be in the highest possible category (4*) for 45% of the faculty member's research output. According to The Guardian's University Guide 2013, the Faculty has the highest ratio of staff to students in any of the top-10 institutions in the country where one can study music in the UK.

Famous current and past members of the faculty 
 
The list includes some of the musicologists, composers and musicians who are or have been active at the faculty:

 Nicholas Cook
 Ian Cross
 Ruth Davis
 Martin Ennis
 Katharine Ellis
 Iain Fenlon
 Marina Frolova-Walker
 Alexander Goehr
 Sarah Hawkins
 Christopher Hogwood
 Robin Holloway
 John Hopkins (composer)
 Nicholas Marston
Susan Rankin
 John Rink
 Jeremy Thurlow
 David Trippett
 Benjamin Walton

References

External links
 Faculty website
 Youtube channel

Music, Faculty of